LeAndrew "Lee" Fobbs Jr. (born May 1, 1950) is an American former gridiron football player and coach. Fobbs played professionally for the Ottawa Rough Riders and Winnipeg Blue Bombers of the Canadian Football League (CFL) and the Detroit Wheels of the World Football League He played college football at Grambling State University and was selected by the Buffalo Bills in the eighth round of the 1973 NFL Draft, but did not play in the National Football League (NFL). Fobbs served as the head football coach at North Carolina A&T State University from 2006 until midway through the 2008 season, compiling a record of 2–28	.

Fobbs was an assistant coach for the LSU Tigers football team in 1994.

Head coaching record

Notes

References

External links
 Grambling State profile

1950 births
Living people
American football running backs
Canadian football running backs
Alabama Crimson Tide football coaches
Baylor Bears football coaches
Grambling State Tigers football coaches
Grambling State Tigers football players
Kansas Jayhawks football coaches
Louisiana–Monroe Warhawks football coaches
LSU Tigers football coaches
Minnesota Golden Gophers football coaches
North Carolina A&T Aggies football coaches
Ottawa Rough Riders players
Southern Miss Golden Eagles football coaches
Texas A&M Aggies football coaches
Tulane Green Wave football coaches
Sportspeople from Monroe, Louisiana
African-American coaches of American football
African-American players of American football
African-American players of Canadian football
20th-century African-American sportspeople
21st-century African-American people